Robert Kovacik is a multiple-award-winning American television journalist based in Los Angeles, California.  He is currently an anchor/reporter for NBC (KNBC) Los Angeles and can be seen worldwide across all NBC platforms.  In 2018, Kovacik won the Emmy for Outstanding Hard News Reporting. He was selected as Journalist of the Year at the 55th Southern California Journalism Awards in 2013. According to the judges, "Robert Kovacik has not only won the trust and respect of his audience but he's won their hearts with solid reporting and integrity."

Kovacik is known for bringing viewers a local perspective and in-depth coverage of national and international events including, the funeral of Queen Elizabeth II, the royal wedding between Prince Harry and Meghan Markle, the terrorist bombing in Manchester, England, the Route 91 Harvest Festival massacre in Las Vegas, the Pulse (nightclub) shooting in Orlando, the Papal Conclave in Rome, and the Summer Olympics in London. The correspondent was later honored by the British Consul-General of Los Angeles for his reporting of the Games. Kovacik also earned Emmy Awards for his coverage of the Olympics, as well as the Papal Conclave in Italy and the mass shooting in Orlando.

Kovacik was elected by his industry peers to serve three consecutive terms as President of the Los Angeles Press Club. After Kovacik was termed-out, he was named an Honorary Board member of the LA Press Club, with the title, President Emeritus.

Kovacik is also a three-time recipient of the Genesis Award, presented by the Humane Society of the United States, recognizing the best media coverage of animal protection issues.

Education
Robert Kovacik holds an honors undergraduate Bachelor of Arts degree from Brown University in Providence, Rhode Island.  Kovacik also has an honors Master's degree from the Columbia University Graduate School of Journalism.  After graduating from Columbia, he spent over 5 years in New York City before moving to California.

Early career
Kovacik began his career at 23 years of age when he became the youngest anchor in New York City for NIGHTWORLD at Public Broadcasting Service (PBS) primary member station, WNET.  In 1994, he relocated to Los Angeles to become an anchor and reporter for KCOP-TV.

Career
Kovacik left KCOP in 2001, and was named the West Coast correspondent, anchor, and bureau chief for the newly formed National Geographic Channel and its nightly news show, National Geographic Today.

Kovacik joined KNBC-TV in 2004. In 2006 a murder suspect chose to surrender to him live on-air., for which he received including a Golden Mike Award and an Edward R. Murrow Award. In 2007 he was on location and struck by a police squad car carrying Paris Hilton. In 2008 he again made international headlines after an angry confrontation between then Los Angeles Police Department Police Chief William Bratton and LA City Councilman Dennis Zine while Kovacik was reporting for Today in LA.

His exclusive examination into the Los Angeles Fire Department's 911 response times prompted the Mayor to call for an audit of the LAFD. His reporting on the investigation surrounding President Clinton's impeachment was included in the Kenneth Starr Report (Starr Report), and his groundbreaking expose into overcrowded LA animal shelters helped force the city to change its laws.

Awards and honors

2021 Emmy Award Nomination, Live Coverage of an Unscheduled Event, "Tiger Woods Crash"
2021 Southern California Journalism Award, Reporter, Public Service News, "The LAPD: Joining the Force"
2021 Golden Mike Award—Reporter, Best TV Sports Reporting, "An Olympic Hopeful at 60"
2021 Golden Mike Award Nomination, Reporter, Best Live Coverage of a News Story, "Tiger Woods Crash"
2020 Golden Mike Award—Reporter, Best Continuing Coverage, "Kobe Bryant's Death"
2020 Golden Mike Award - A, Best 30 Minute Newscast, 11pm 
2019: Genesis Award (Above and Beyond Award) - Reporter, "Life Connected—Canine on Call"
2019: Golden Mike Award - Anchor, Best 30 Minute Newscast, 11pm
2019: Golden Mike Award - Anchor, Best 60 Minute Newscast, 6pm
2019: Golden Mike Award - Reporter, Best Continuing Coverage, “Borderline Shooting.” 
2019: Emmy Award, Live Special Events—News, “Borderline: One Year Later.”
2018: Emmy Award, Outstanding Hard News Reporting
2018: Emmy Award Nomination, Light News Story-Single Report, "Communicating on Canvas"
2017: Emmy Award, News Special, Orlando Shooting,  
2017: Emmy Award Nomination, Serious News Story—Single Report, "Hidden Hazard"
2017: Emmy Award Nomination, Outstanding News Feature Reporting
2017: nomination for "Light News Story (Single Report): ("Dive Warriors")"
2016:  Emmy Award, Culture/History, "50 Watts"
2016:  Emmy Nomination, Serious News Story—Single Report, "Hollywood Transgender Beating"
2016:  Emmy Nomination, Light News Story—Multi-Part Report, "Fergus"
2016:  Emmy Nomination, Outstanding Hard News Reporting
2016 Golden Mike Award, Best Business and Consumer Reporting, "Stolen Gas",
2016 Golden Mike Award, Best Political and Government Reporting, "LAPD and the Mafia Hitman: From Killer to Keynote Speaker"
2015 Emmy Award nomination, Outstanding Hard News Reporting
2015 Golden Mike Award, Best Light Feature Reporting, "Night Crawlers"
2014 Emmy Award, Light News Story-Multi-Part Report, "The Papal Conclave: SoCal at the Vatican"
2014 nomination for Emmy Award, "Outstanding News Feature Reporting"
2013 Emmy Award, Sports Series, "The Summer Olympics: SoCal Shines at the Summer Games" 
2013 nomination for Emmy Award, Serious News Story, "LAFD Response Times" 
2013 nomination for Emmy Awards, Light News Story, "Cash for your Crib"
2013 LA Press Club, "Television Journalist of the Year", Robert Kovacik 
2013 Journalist of the Year at the 55th Southern California Journalism Awards
2013 LA Press Club, "Investigative Television Reporting", "LAFD Response Times: How Long Will You Wait."
2012 nomination for Emmy Award, "Outstanding Hard News Reporting"
2011 Emmy Award, "Crime/Social Issues"
2011 nomination for Emmy Award, "Outstanding Light News Story: Hef Saves the Hollywood Sign"
2011 APTRA, "Best Documentary"
2010, Golden Mike Award for 'Best Documentary', "LA Heroes: Untold Stories of Haiti"
2009, nomination for Emmy Award "Outstanding Feature Reporter"
2009, 2nd Place, LA Press Club National Entertainment Journalism Award
2009, APTRA 'Chris Harris Reporter of the Year' award
2008, Golden Mike Award, "Paparazzi Task Force"
2008, nomination for Emmy Award, 'Light News Story – Single Report'
2007, nomination for Emmy Award for 'Murder Suspect Surrenders'
2007, Edward R. Murrow Award "Best Spot News Coverage"
2006, Golden Mike Award "Best Spot News Coverage'
2006, Genesis Award, "Elephant Exhibit at the LA Zoo"
2000, Emmy Award for "Serious News Report"
1999, nomination for Emmy Award for 'Informational/Public Affairs Series'
1999, nomination for Emmy Award for 'Serious News Story – Single Report'
1998, nomination for Emmy Award for 'Live Sports Coverage'
1998, Emmy Award,  'Host, Outstanding Special Programming'
1998, Greater Los Angeles Press Club Award for 'Best Serious Feature Reporting'
1997, nomination for Emmy Award for 'Serious News Story'
1997, California/Nevada Associated Press Award for 'Continuing Investigation'
1997, Multi-Part Genesis Award for 'Best Series Serious News Story'
1995, First Place in 'Best of the West' Competition for 'Outstanding Local Television News Series, Growth and Urban Development Reporting"

References

External links 

Robert Kovacik at NBC News

American broadcast news analysts
American television reporters and correspondents
Living people
Television anchors from Los Angeles
NBC News people
Brown University alumni
Columbia University Graduate School of Journalism alumni
Year of birth missing (living people)